The 2011 by-election in Oldham East and Saddleworth was a by-election for the Parliament of the United Kingdom's House of Commons constituency of Oldham East and Saddleworth held on 13 January 2011. Labour Party candidate Debbie Abrahams held the seat for her party with an increased majority over the Liberal Democrats, succeeding Phil Woolas, whose victory in the 2010 general election had been declared void because he had knowingly made false statements attacking his Liberal Democrat opponent's personal character.

Background

The election was triggered on 5 November 2010 after sitting MP Phil Woolas was reported personally guilty of "knowingly making false statements" about the personal character of his Liberal Democrat opponent, Elwyn Watkins, during the 2010 general election campaign by an election court consisting of two High Court judges. In consequence, Woolas ceased to be an MP on 5 November and was banned from holding public office for three years.

Woolas applied for a judicial review of the decision: his initial application was rejected, but he entered a second request for a review. Speaker of the House of Commons John Bercow stated that a date for the by-election would not be set until all legal proceedings were complete. Woolas's second request for review was heard at the High Court on 16 November 2010; the Court of Appeal announced on 3 December 2010 that, although one of the three statements on which the election court had found Woolas guilty was not within the Act, the other two were and so the judgment was upheld, after which Woolas declared "That's it – I'm out", conceding defeat and leaving the way open for the by-election.

By parliamentary convention, the party who last held the seat moves the writ for the by-election, and it was rumoured that Labour planned to call the election for 3 February 2011. However, a writ for the election was instead moved for 13 January by the Liberal Democrats.

The contest was the first by-election of the 2010 parliament, and the first by-election to be caused by an election court overturning the previous result since the 1997 Winchester by-election. It is also notable for being the earliest by-election in the calendar year for 55 years and the fifth-earliest since the First World War.

Candidates
The Labour Party had more than eighty members apply to be their candidate in the election. Initial frontrunner Afzal Khan was not shortlisted, and the party instead selected Debbie Abrahams from a shortlist of three. Abrahams had unsuccessfully fought to retain the Colne Valley seat at the 2010 general election after the retirement of Kali Mountford, where Labour fell from first to third place, and is married to the former Lancashire cricket captain John Abrahams. The Liberal Democrats again selected Elwyn Watkins to fight the by-election; Watkins is a former Rochdale borough councillor who had previously worked as a business advisor to a Saudi Arabian sheikh. The Conservative Party also reselected their general election candidate, Kashif Ali, a barrister from Higginshaw.

Two other parties who stood in the general election confirmed new candidates for the by-election. The British National Party at first announced that their candidate would be party leader Nick Griffin, who had stood in neighbouring Oldham West and Royton in 2001. However Griffin was replaced by former Manchester pub landlord Derek Adams, who had contested Blackley and Broughton at the 2010 general election. The UK Independence Party nominated their new deputy leader, Paul Nuttall, who was, at the time, a Member of the European Parliament (MEP) for North West England.

Three further smaller parties which had not fought the general election put up candidates. The Green Party chose Peter Allen, from nearby Glossop; he works in an advice centre in Manchester. Stephen Morris, an official of Manchester Metrolink and trade union branch official, was announced as the candidate for the English Democrats; he is also chairman of the party. Musician, composer and teacher Loz Kaye, who had recently become leader of the Pirate Party, was also nominated.

Two further fringe candidates had less serious agendas. Nick Delves, who had acquired the nickname "the flying brick" after a paragliding accident, became the Official Monster Raving Loony Party candidate, while artist and poet David Bishop (founder of the Church of the Militant Elvis Party) offered himself to the electors as a 'Bus Pass Elvis' candidate.

Campaign

As the first by-election since the establishment of the Conservative-Liberal Democrat coalition government, there was interest in whether the two parties would form a pact. Prime Minister David Cameron publicly wished Watkins well at the start of the campaign, but both parties officially rejected the idea that there was a pact, with Vince Cable of the Liberal Democrats claiming that the Tories had no chance of winning the seat, and Cameron later reminding voters that it had been a three-horse race in 2010. Both former Lib Dem leader Charles Kennedy and Labour Party leader Ed Miliband claimed that it was the first opportunity for voters to make their views known on the coalition, although David Cameron argued that it was instead about the actions of Woolas. Woolas himself claimed that his disqualification would help the Labour Party, as voters would object to courts overturning the election result.

The Labour Party complained that the date of the by-election would make it difficult for students to vote, as they would not yet have returned to their studies in the constituency. However, the Liberal Democrats claimed that this would be outweighed by the number of students at their parents' houses during their holidays from universities elsewhere.

Leaders of all three major parties campaigned in the seat in the run-up to the election, David Cameron noted that he was the first prime minister to campaign in an English by-election since 1997, when Tony Blair campaigned in the Uxbridge by-election – Gordon Brown had campaigned in 2008 for the Glenrothes by-election in Scotland. On 6 January, a week prior to the by-election, The Times endorsed the Liberal Democrats and their candidate Elwyn Watkins.

On the last weekend of the campaign, Liberal Democrat MP and government minister Andrew Stunell issued a party press release hailing a government scheme to reuse empty homes. The scheme was only officially unveiled on the following Monday, and shadow Minister for the Cabinet Office Jon Trickett wrote to the Cabinet Secretary Sir Gus O'Donnell questioning whether Stunell's actions had broken the rules on election period 'purdah'. O'Donnell wrote back on 12 January explaining that Stunell "recognises with hindsight" that his party press release could have been linked by the public with a government spending announcement, and that Stunell had apologised for the mistake.

Two opinion polling companies released constituency polls for the by-election on 8 January. ICM and Populus used sample sizes of 340 and 772, respectively (excluding those who refused to respond or did not specify a party). ICM's figures of Labour 44%, Liberal Democrats 27% and Conservatives 18% represented a sharp percentage decrease of 8% for the Conservatives, contrasted with a sizable 12% increase for Labour and a modest 5% decline in Liberal Democrat support since the 2010 general election, indicating a secure Labour victory in the constituency. Populus' figures uncovered similar trends, recording voting intention as Labour 46%, Liberal Democrats 29% and Conservatives 15%, representing percentage changes since May 2010 of −11% for the Conservatives, +14% for Labour and −3% for the Liberal Democrats. A telephone poll by Survation reported voting intention figures of Labour 31%, Liberal Democrats 30%, Conservatives 6% and undecided 23% (note the ICM and Populus poll figures exclude undecideds), on a sample size of 293 (excluding those who refused to respond).

Result
Having only narrowly retained the seat at the general election eight months earlier, Labour retained it once again but this time with a vastly increased majority, with the Liberal Democrats finishing second.

See also
List of United Kingdom by-elections
Opinion polling for the 2015 United Kingdom general election

Notes

References

External links
Oldham Council – Oldham East and Saddleworth by-election
Oldham East and Saddleworth By-Election Declaration – YouTube

Candidate websites
Debbie Abrahams – Labour Party candidate
Kashif Ali – Conservative Party candidate
Peter Allen – Green Party candidate
Loz Kaye – Pirate Party candidate
Stephen Morris – English Democrats candidate
Paul Nuttall – UKIP candidate
Elwyn Watkins – Liberal Democrats candidate

Oldham East and Saddleworth
Oldham East and Saddleworth
Oldham East and Saddleworth 2011
Oldham East and Saddleworth 2011
2010s in Greater Manchester